Lesser Matters is the debut studio album by Swedish indie pop band The Radio Dept. It was released on 4 March 2003 by Labrador Records.

The song "Keen on Boys" was featured in Sofia Coppola's Marie Antoinette, also appearing on the soundtrack to the film. "Strange Things Will Happen" was also featured in The Fault in Our Stars.

Critical reception

Lesser Matters received rave reviews from critics. The album holds a rating of 84 out of 100 on the review aggregation website Metacritic, indicating "universal acclaim". It was ranked the ninth best album of 2004 by NME.

Track listing

Personnel
Credits for Lesser Matters adapted from album liner notes.

The Radio Dept.
 Johan Duncansson – vocals, guitar, keyboards
 Martin Larsson – guitar, keyboards, backing vocals
 Lisa Carlberg – bass, piano
 Per Blomgren – drums

Additional musicians
 Elin Almered – lead vocals (track 10)
 Johannes Burström – Roland Juno-60 synthesiser (tracks 3 and 8)

Production
 Johan Duncansson – mixing, recording
 Martin Larsson – mixing, recording
 Thomas Eberger – mastering

Artwork and design
 Elin Almered – cover artwork, painting
 Mattias Berglund – sleeve design
 Mårten Carlberg – photography

Charts

References

2003 debut albums
The Radio Dept. albums
Labrador Records albums